Hinde's babbler (Turdoides hindei), also known as Hinde's pied-babbler, is a species of bird in the family Leiothrichidae.  It is endemic to Kenya.  Its natural habitats are subtropical or tropical moist shrubland, arable land, and plantations.  It is threatened by habitat loss.

See also
Wajee Nature Park

References

Turdoides
Endemic birds of Kenya
Birds described in 1900
Taxonomy articles created by Polbot